Mitì Vigliero Lami (born 1957) is an Italian journalist, writer, and poet. Born Maria Teresa Bianca Agata Anita (nickname, "Miti") in Turin, Italy, she has lived in Genoa since 1980.

Her areas of experienced include journalist of society, folklore, history of the Italian language and custom, author of numerous humorous books. She is the only woman who have won the International Festival of the Humor of Bordighera, Italy, twice. She also writes for the Italian newspapers Il Giornale, la Repubblica, Libero and magazines Cosmopolitan, Anna and Ticino 7.

Works

Fiction
In campagna non fa freddo - Le avventure di una famiglia in fuga dalla città, 2000, Mondadori,

Poetry
E sia follia, 1986, NEG
Teatrino, collected poetry, 1982–92
Ci scambiavamo sospiri, e tu avevi la luce della luna, love poems, 2002–03

Essays
Maturità, poesie in prosa, 1992, Sansoni, 
Ricette raccontate: Liguria - Storia della gastronomia ligure, 1998, Idea Libri, 
L'Alice delle meraviglie - Storia, curiosità e ricette dell'acciuga, "pane del mare", 1998, Marsilio, 
Saporitissimo Giglio - Storia, curiosità e ricette dell'aglio, Phoetidissimum Lylium, uno dei più antichi ingredienti della cucina di tutto il mondo, 2002, Marsilio,

Humor
Lo stupidario della Maturità - Come restare immaturi e vivere felici), 1991, Rizzoli, 
Il sale di Adamo - Come comportarsi in modo disastroso e vivere felici), 1993, Rizzoli, 
Il galateo delle scuse - Prontuario ad uso dei bugiardi, 1994, Mondadori,

Sources
Dattero d'Argento, International Festival of the Humor of Bordighera, Italy, 1991, "Lo stupidario della Maturità"
Dattero d'Oro, International Festival of the Humor of Bordighera, Italy, 1994, "Il galateo delle scuse"

External links
 
 Personal blog

1957 births
Living people
Italian women poets
Italian women novelists
Women humorists
Italian humorists
Italian women journalists
Journalists from Turin
20th-century Italian women writers
21st-century Italian women writers
Italian essayists
Male essayists
Italian women essayists
20th-century Italian novelists
20th-century Italian poets
21st-century Italian poets
20th-century essayists
21st-century essayists
Italian male non-fiction writers
Writers from Turin
20th-century Italian male writers